Trojan War is a 1997 American romantic comedy film directed by George Huang and starring Will Friedle, Jennifer Love Hewitt, and Marley Shelton. The film was a critical and box office failure. Produced for $15 million, it made only $309 in ticket sales because it was played in a single movie theater and was pulled after only a week.

Plot
High school student Brad (Will Friedle) has had an  unrequited crush on a classmate named Brooke (Marley Shelton) for years. After she asks him to come over one night to tutor her, she ends up wanting to have sex with him. But she only wants safe sex, and he does not have a condom (the use of Trojan in the title is a pun on the condom brand of the same name). In his quest to buy some condoms, he runs into all sorts of trouble; his dad's Jaguar  gets stolen and then wrecked, he has a run-in with a crazy bus driver (Anthony Michael Hall), he is held hostage, he is pursued by a school janitor (Paulo Tocha) who accuses him of drawing graffiti, an odd pair of Hispanic siblings (Christine Deaver and Mike Moroff) who thinks he looks like David Hasselhoff, Brooke's dog, Brooke's jealous boyfriend Kyle (Eric Balfour), and a homeless man (David Patrick Kelly) who wants two dollars from him (and has secretly stolen his wallet), and he is arrested.

After all of this and finally receiving a condom from a police officer (Lee Majors, who played Steve Austin in the 1970s TV series The Six Million Dollar Man; Major's policeman-character here is named "Officer Austin" as a nod to Majors' previous well-known role) who releases him, he realizes that the perfect girl has been there for him all along: his best friend Leah (Jennifer Love Hewitt), who has had feelings for him for a long time unbeknownst to Brad. Finally, Brad realizes his own feelings for Leah while also discovering Brooke is not as great as he thought she was, after he finds out that she only wants a one night stand with him instead of a relationship.  Brad runs out to find Leah and professes his feelings to her, and they kiss each other by moonlight.

After the end credits, Brad's parents are shocked by the sight of what is left of their car after the tow truck driver brings it back.

Cast
 Will Friedle as Brad Kimble
 Jennifer Love Hewitt as Leah Jones
 Marley Shelton as Brooke Kingsley
 Danny Masterson as Seth
 Jason Marsden as Josh
 Eric Balfour as Kyle
 Lee Majors as Officer Austin
 John Finn as Ben Kimble
 Wendie Malick as Beverly Kimble
 Jennie Kwan as Trish
 Charlotte Lopez as Nina
 Christine Deaver as Latin Mama
 Mike Moroff as Big Brother
 lobo Sebastian as Lead Homeboy
 Joe Cerrano as Biggest Homeboy
 Julian Cegario as Homeboy
 Paulo Tocha as Janitor
 Anthony Michael Hall as Bus Driver
 David Patrick Kelly as Bagman
 Danny Trejo as Scarface

Production
Prior to the film's release, it was noted that there were similarities with its condom plot to another film in development, Booty Call, which featured an all-black cast and which would also be released in 1997. Booty Call was written without knowledge of Trojan War'''s existence.

Music
Songs featured in the motion picture: 
 "I'll Fall With Your Knife" - Performed by Peter Murphy
 "Disappear" - Performed by Letters To Cleo
 "You Are Here" - Performed by Star 69
 "All Five Senses" - Performed by Pomegranate
 "The Word Behind Words" - Performed by Jeremy Toback
 "The Love You Save" - Performed by Madder Rose
 "Snakebellies" - Performed by Fu Manchu
 "The Boys Are Back In Town" - Performed by The Cardigans
 "I Hope I Don't Fall In Love With You" - Performed by Jennifer Love Hewitt
 "You're One" - Performed by Imperial Teen
 "I Have A Date" - Performed by The Vandals
 "Underdog" - Performed by astroPuppees
 "Next To You" - Performed by Dance Hall Crashers
 "Yo Soy El Son Cubano" - Performed by Parmenio Salazar
 "Mistreated" - Performed by Shufflepuck
 "Don't Be" - Performed by astroPuppees
 "Disco Inferno" - Performed by The Trammps
 "American Girl" - Performed by Everclear
 "American City World" - Performed by Triple Fast Action
 "What a Bore" - Performed by Muzzle
 "Boom, Boom, Boom" - Performed by Juster
 "I Believe In" - Performed by Jennifer Love Hewitt
 "I'll Fall With Your Knife" - Performed by Tom Hiel
 "Trouble" - Performed by Shampoo
 "I've Got a Flair" - Performed by Fountains of Wayne
 "Can't Hold Me Down" - Performed by Schleprock
 "The Burning" - Performed by Teta Vega

Box office
The film was released in only a single movie theatre and was pulled after only one week. It earned a total of $309 against a production budget of $15 million.

As of 2007 it was the fifth lowest grossing film since modern record keeping began in the 1980s. Dade Hayes of Variety magazine explained that a single theater release is more about fulfilling contractual obligations than anything to do with audience reaction to the film.

Reception
Nathan Rabin of The Onion's The A.V. Club'' wrote: "It may be formulaic, predictable and as substantial as a Little Debbie snack cake, but as a loving, inane throwback to the golden age of the Brat Pack and the two Coreys, it's irresistible."
Charles Tatum of efilmcritic wrote: "Sometimes, a movie comes along that makes you want to sob, and not in the good way."

References

External links
 
 
 

1997 films
1990s teen comedy films
1997 romantic comedy films
Films directed by George Huang
Films scored by George S. Clinton
Warner Bros. films
1990s English-language films